Patrick Slavin (5 May 1877 – 13 November 1916) was a Scottish professional footballer who played in the Scottish League for Motherwell and Celtic as an outside right.

Personal life 
Slavin served as a sergeant in the Royal Scots during the First World War. At the time of his enlistment in February 1915, he was working as a foreman at Braehead Quarry, Edinburgh. Slavin was killed during a failed attack on Serre-lès-Puisieux on 13 November 1916, during the Battle of the Ancre. He was buried in Serre Road Cemetery No. 2.

Career statistics

References 

Scottish footballers
1916 deaths
British Army personnel of World War I
1877 births
Scottish Football League players
Celtic F.C. players
Sportspeople from Shotts
Royal Scots soldiers
Association football outside forwards
Motherwell F.C. players
Dykehead F.C. players
Scottish military personnel
Albion Rovers F.C. players
British military personnel killed in the Battle of the Somme
Footballers from North Lanarkshire